Vohwinkel may refer to:

Vohwinkel, Wuppertal, a former city, now a district of the city of Wuppertal, North Rhine-Westphalia, Germany
Wuppertal-Vohwinkel station, a railway station in Vohwinkel
Vohwinkel Schwebebahn, a railway station on the Wuppertal Schwebebahn
Franz Vohwinkel (born 1964), German artist
TSG Vohwinkel, former German football club merged into Wuppertaler SV
Vohwinkel syndrome, cutaneous condition

See also 
Vowinckel (disambiguation), German surname